Donald Lesley Harris (born February 8, 1954) is a former American football safety in the National Football League for the Washington Redskins and the New York Giants.  He played college football at Rutgers University and was drafted in the eleventh round of the 1977 NFL Draft.

1954 births
Living people
Sportspeople from Elizabeth, New Jersey
American football safeties
Rutgers Scarlet Knights football players
Washington Redskins players
New York Giants players
Players of American football from New Jersey